A constitutional referendum was held in Algeria on 23 February 1989. Coming after the 1988 October Riots, the new constitution removed references to socialism and allowed for multi-party democracy. Despite calls for a boycott by radical Islamists and opposition from trade unions and FLN members, the amendments were approved by 73.4% of voters with a 79% turnout. Local elections were scheduled for the following year, with parliamentary elections to be held in 1991.

Results

References

Constitutional referendum
Algerian constitutional referendum
Constitutional referendums in Algeria
Algerian constitutional referendum